Crispiano Adames is a politician from Panama who is serving as President of the National Assembly of Panama and Deputy of Democratic Revolutionary Party.

References 

Panamanian politicians
Presidents of the National Assembly (Panama)